The 2020–21 season was BG Pathum United F.C.'s first season back in the Thai League 1 after being promoted from the 2019 Thai League 2 as winners.

Coach Dusit continued to coach the team after extending his contract.

On March 1, all of Thai League 1 matches between 7 and 31 march will be played behind closed doors as broadcast only events. However, on March 4, the decision changed to postpone all of matches prior to 18 April due to the coronavirus pandemic in Thailand.

It was later confirmed that the match will restarted in September 2020 and end in May 2021.

Squad

Transfer

Pre-season transfer

In

Out

Loan Out

Return from loan

Extension / Retained

Mid-season transfer

In

Out

Loan Out

Return from loan

Extension

Friendlies

Pre-Season Friendly 

Leo Cup 2020 Thailand - 23 to 30 January

Mid-Season Friendly

Competitions

Overview

Thai League 1

Thai FA Cup

Team statistics

Appearances and goals

Notes

References 

BG Pathum United F.C. seasons
Bangkok Glass